Carroll Park Methodist Episcopal Church is a former Methodist church in Brooklyn, New York, formerly located at 295 Carroll Street, Carroll Gardens, Brooklyn, New York City. The Victorian Gothic edifice was erected c.1890 and located within the Carroll Gardens historic district. It was reused as Norwegian Methodist Episcopal Church, reflecting the large Scandinavian population in Brooklyn between the 1890s and 1949. It was "sold in 1949 and reused as the South Brooklyn Christian Assembly Church but as of 1977, it was largely demolished and redeveloped into three townhouses with no evidence of the church remaining."

References 

Churches completed in 1890
19th-century Methodist church buildings in the United States
Methodist churches in New York City
Churches in Brooklyn
Closed churches in New York City
Demolished churches in New York City
Demolished buildings and structures in Brooklyn
Victorian architecture in New York City
Gothic Revival church buildings in New York City
Carroll Gardens, Brooklyn
Norwegian-American culture in New York (state)